Ibrahim Moustafa Reyadh (born 5 April 1941) is a retired Egyptian football player. His real name is Ibrahim Mohammed Reyadh but Moustafa Reyadh is the nickname.

Career
Reyadh played club football for Tersana Club. He is the third all-time scorer in the Egyptian Premier League with 123 goals.

Reyadh played for the Egypt national football team in the 1964 Summer Olympics in Tokyo, where he was 2nd top scorer with 8 goals. Reyadh also played for Egypt in the 1962 and 1963 African Cup of Nations.

Honours 
Tersana
 Egyptian Premier League: 1962–63
 Egyptian Cup: 1964–65, 1966–67

Individual
 Egyptian Premier League Top scorer: 1961–62, 1963–64
Olympic Games second top scorer: 1964

Moustafa Reyadh's league scoring history

References

External links
 

1941 births
Living people
Egyptian footballers
Egypt international footballers
Footballers at the 1964 Summer Olympics
Olympic footballers of Egypt
1962 African Cup of Nations players
1963 African Cup of Nations players
Competitors at the 1963 Mediterranean Games
Tersana SC players
Association football forwards
Mediterranean Games competitors for Egypt